Events from the year 1975 in Pakistan.

Incumbents

Federal government  
President: Fazal Ilahi Chaudhry
Prime Minister: Zulfikar Ali Bhutto
Chief Justice: Hamoodur Rahman (until 1 November), Muhammad Yaqub Ali

Governors
Governor of Balochistan: Ahmad Yar Khan 
Governor of Khyber Pakhtunkhwa: Syed Ghawas 
Governor of Punjab: 
 until 14 March: Sadiq Hussain Qureshi
 14 March-31 July: Ghulam Mustafa Khar
 until 31 July: Mohammad Abbas Abbasi 
Governor of Sindh: Begum Ra'ana Liaquat Ali Khan

Events

September
Pakistan loses a hockey title match to India.

Births
 13 August – Shoaib Akhtar

Deaths
 8 February – Hayat Sherpao, Governor of Khyber Pakhtunkhwa

See also
1974 in Pakistan
Other events of 1975
1976 in Pakistan
List of Pakistani films of 1975
Timeline of Pakistani history

References

 
1975 in Asia